The Mordecai Puryear House is a center-hall house in Franklin, Tennessee, United States, built around 1830. Mordecai Puryear was one of the ten original investors in the National Bank of Franklin in 1871.  The bank "was one of the primary financial institutions of the county" until it failed  in 1926.  

The property was listed on the National Register of Historic Places in 1988. The house has been included in a tour of historic Franklin houses.

The house was built circa 1830 and was expanded twice, around 1850 and in 1907.

References

1830 establishments in Tennessee
Central-passage houses in Tennessee
Federal architecture in Tennessee
Houses completed in 1830
Houses in Franklin, Tennessee
Houses on the National Register of Historic Places in Tennessee
National Register of Historic Places in Williamson County, Tennessee